The seventh series of British talent competition programme Britain's Got Talent was broadcast on ITV, from 13 April to 8 June 2013; because of England's international friendly with the Republic of Ireland that year, the show took a break on 29 May to avoid clashing with live coverage of the match. Because of the work schedule of Stephen Mulhern, host of Britain's Got More Talent, filmed auditions had to be pushed back to mid-January that year, while no guest judge was brought in despite the absence of Simon Cowell for an audition session. Following the previous series, the programme's format was given a minor amendment - the cash prize offered to winners was reduced to £250,000 from this series onwards.

The seventh series was won by shadow theatre troupe Attraction, the first foreign national participant to win the competition and finishing in first place and comedian Jack Carroll finishing in second place. During its broadcast, the series averaged around 10.4 million viewers. The programme faced severe criticism from viewers over a number of auditions that were broadcast as part of the sixth series, while production staff had to investigate a breach of security after a protester managed to pelt Cowell with eggs during a live broadcast of a finalist's performance.

Series overview
Following open auditions, the Judges' auditions were held in January and February 2013, within Cardiff, London, Glasgow, Manchester and Birmingham. Although filming was planned to begin by 7 January, it was pushed back to 16 January due to Stephen Mulhern's schedule  as host for Britain's Got More Talent, he would provide feedback and present additional auditions not featured on the main programme, but filming on the original date would have clashed with his involvement for Catchphrase that month. Most of the auditions that took place were uneventful; although Cowell was forced to miss most of the auditions on the second day in Manchester due to illness, production staff opted to proceed with these without bringing in a guest judge to stand in for him.

Of the participants that took part, only forty five made it past this stage and into the five live semi-finals, with nine appearing in each one, and eleven of these acts making it into the live final; the wildcard act chosen by the judges was ventriloquist Steve Hewlett, after he lost out in the Judges' vote in the fifth semi-final. The following below lists the results of each participant's overall performance in this series:

 |  | 
 |  Judges' Wildcard Finalist

  Ages denoted for a participant(s), pertain to their final performance for this series.
  Rob's Duelling Pianos became a solo act, after a member of the act left before the semi-final.

Semi-finals summary
 Buzzed out |  Judges' vote | 
 |  |

Semi-final 1 (27 May)
Guest Performer, Results Show: Ellie Goulding

Semi-final 2 (28 May)
Guest Performer, Results Show: Jennifer Lopez

Semi-final 3 (30 May)
Guest Performer, Results Show: Demi Lovato

Semi-final 4 (31 May)
Guest Performer, Results Show: Olly Murs

Semi-final 5 (1 June)
Guest Performers, Results Show: Ashleigh and Pudsey

  Steve Hewlett was later sent through to the final as the judges wildcard.

Final (8 June)
Guest Performers, Results Show: Psy, and Taylor Swift & Ed Sheeran

 |

Ratings

Criticism & incidents

Unsuitable, and "sexualised" auditions
The seventh series faced criticism from viewers, covering two sets of complaints regarding auditions that were conducted in the 2013 contest. The first set concerned the nature of auditions made by Scarlet Cuffs, Keri Graham and Kelly Fox, that were deemed unsuitable for a family-orientated programme and for broadcast before the 9pm watershed - both Cuffs and Graham conducted a provocative striptease as part of their auditions, while Fox used lyrics that were considered vulgar. Ofcom investigated the editing of the auditions by the striptease acts, and ruled that while Graham's had been carefully censored to an acceptable level, they found in contrast that censoring of Cuffs' audition was insufficient and that the footage breached broadcasting codes in regards to protecting children from unsuitable content, with it made clear that the act should not have been shown. Fox refuted criticism on her performance, yet a member of the National Association of Head Teachers raised questions over the "morality" of allowing the audition footage to be shown.

The second set focused on the audition of two young children, Arisxandra Libantino, and Asanda, who used songs in their performances that were deemed inappropriate for their age - Libantino's performance involved singing Jennifer Hudson's "One Night Only", while Asanda's involved the singing of Rihanna's "Diamonds" alongside a provocative dance routine. The release of the footage by ITV raised questions from Vivienne Pattison, director of Mediawatch UK, over the programme's portrayal of children, deeming the auditions as effectively "sexualising children" on television.

Cowell's "egg attack" in final
Security arrangements for the programme came under questioning during the latter half of the series, after a protester managed to infiltrate the live finals and conduct a protest against both miming on live television shows and Simon Cowell's influence in the music industry. The programme had to make clear that the protester, Natalie Holt, was not conducting a publicity stunt, when she took to the stage during the performance of finalists Richard & Adam in order to throw eggs at Cowell. The investigation into the breach found that Holt managed not only to circumvent security processes by posing as a backing musician for the finalists, but was able to smuggle in the eggs due to inadequate examinations of her possessions. The motive for her protest was later revealed to be in part over her failure to secure a place during the 2012 contest, when she auditioned with her classical band.

References

2013 British television seasons
Britain's Got Talent